Allan Chandler (3 June 1907 – 14 March 1970) was an Australian rules footballer who played for the Hawthorn Football Club in the Victorian Football League (VFL).

Early life
The son of politician Alfred Elliott Chandler (1873–1935) and Marie Christiane Chandler (1881–1958), nee Intemann, Allan Chandler was born at Boronia on 3 June 1907.

Football
Allan Chandler moved to Hawthorn from Burwood, making his debut as a ruckman midway through the 1928 season against Fitzroy. In the final game of that season his brother Gilbert also played for Hawthorn in his only senior VFL game. Allan Chandler went on to play 55 games over five seasons with Hawthorn.

War service
Chandler enlisted in the Royal Australian Air Force during World War II, serving as a Leading Aircraftman for 20 months.

Later life
After his football career, Chandler worked as a nurseryman and florist in the outer eastern suburbs of Melbourne. 

Allan Chandler died suddenly in Prahran on 14 March 1970, at the age of 62, and was cremated at Springvale Botanical Cemetery.

Notes

External links 

1907 births
1970 deaths
Australian rules footballers from Melbourne
Hawthorn Football Club players
Australian military personnel of World War II
Royal Australian Air Force personnel of World War II
People from Boronia, Victoria
Military personnel from Melbourne